In the mythology of Mangaia, Tau-Titi is a son of Miru.  

A nocturnal dance dedicated to and named after him was practised, occasionally with the Tapairu, Tau-Titi's sisters. As soon as the dawn arrives, the Tapairu returned to their home in Avaiki.

References
R.D. Craig, Dictionary of Polynesian Mythology (Greenwood Press: New York, 1989), 33–34; 
W.W. Gill, Myths and Songs of the South Pacific (H.S. King: London, 1876), 256–7.

Mangaia mythology